Marfa Dmitrievna Sharoiko (1898-1978) was a Soviet-Belarusian Politician (Communist).

She served as Minister of Food- and Dairy Industry.

References

1898 births
1978 deaths
20th-century Belarusian women politicians
20th-century Belarusian politicians
Soviet women in politics
Belarusian communists
Women government ministers of Belarus